Hum Kahan Ke Sachay Thay (English literal:When were we truthful?) is a Pakistani drama television series based on the novel of same name by Umera Ahmad. Directed by Farooq Rind, the serial is co-produced by Soul Fry Films and MD Productions. It features Mahira Khan, Kubra Khan and Usman Mukhtar in lead roles. It premiered on 1 August 2021 on Hum TV.

The series received mixed to negative reviews throughout its broadcast, it also gained praise for its premise and performances of female leads while received negative reviews for glorification of toxicity.

Plot 
The story revolves around three cousins: Aswad(Usman Mukhtar), Mehreen(Mahira Khan), and Mashal(Kubra Khan). Aswad is humble and friendly and close to both Mashal and Mehreen. Mashal is known for her beauty and is in love with Aswad. Mehreen is poor but simple but also in love with Aswad. Mehreen, Mashal, and Aswad were three best friends. Mehreen's grandmother hates her because her dad is a drug addict. One day, Mehreen's dad(Omair Rana) gets caught by his wife, Rabia(Laila Wasti) for fraud and stealing her jewelry to buy drugs. She leaves him threatening him that she will take Mehreen with her. Mansoor, Mehreen's father, who loves Mehreen so much is unable to tolerate the idea of his daughter being away from him forever and commits suicide by heroin overdose.

Mehreen's mother gets remarried and neglects Mehreen as her step-dad does not want to keep her. Mehreen moves in with Mashal's parents and her grandmother, Everybody hates her. Mehreen lives a lonely life; however, she is smart academically and artistically. She is also a strong girl who has lived a bitter life as her childhood has been snatched from her. She does not let anyone get in her way. Having lost her mother and father, she has no support, except for her aunt, Saleha (Huma Nawab) who is Aswad's mother. She has always been a top student and participates in art competitions which she bags first place. She loves to debate and is a talented artist. Her friends admire her which makes Mashal really envious of her. Aswad's mother, Saleha, is the sole person who knows Mehreen's reality and loves her dearly, like a daughter.

However, Mashal is the complete opposite of Mehreen. She was extremely beautiful and neither bright in her academics nor is she artistic in nature. Shagufta(Zainab Qayyum), Mashal's mother, seeing Mehreen's qualities forces Mashal to 'be like Mehreen'. This then creates an inferiority complex in Mashal and becomes obsessed with Mehreen, wanting to be her. She gets access to Mehreen's room and reads her diaries, getting insight into Mehreen's likes, dislikes and her lifestyle. She also finds out how much Mehreen hates her.

All this while, Mashal is in close contact with Aswad who lives in America, feeding him with false information about Mehreen's shenanigans; claiming that she smokes and has many boyfriends. Oftentimes, claiming Mehreen's academic and artistic victories as her own. Aswad gets brain washed by Mashal about Mehreen and begins to dislike her, in disbelief that his once best friend is going rogue.

The story progresses when Saleha wants Mehreen to marry Aswad as it has always been her long time wish, which also goes in favour of Mehreen as she was always in love with Aswad. Meanwhile, Mehreen’s friend's cousin, Saffwan(Haroon Shahid), becomes romantically interested in Mehreen. Mashal finds out about this and in order to get revenge, reads Mehreen's diary, she gets to know about Saffwan. Mashal tells Saffwan about Mehreen's past including her dad's drug addiction. This creates a misunderstanding between Saffwan and Mehreen. However, Saffwan comes to realize it that it was all Mashal's doing. He proposes to Mehreen. Mehreen rejects him by telling him that he doesn't know anything about her past and once he gets to know it, he will hate her like the others.

Seeing that her plan has failed, Mashal decides to tell Aswad that she loves him and wants to marry him. Aswad, who also likes Mashal, agrees and tells his mom about Mashal. His mother rejects Mashal and insists only wants Mehreen as his wife. Aswad tells Mashal that he can not marry her. This breaks Mashal's heart but she tells Aswad that she forgives him and wants him to be happy. Aswad leaves for Karachi with his mother for few days. One night, Mashal is found dead in her room. Everyone blames Mehreen for Mashal's murder. Mehreen is arrested. Shabbo, their maid, knew everything about what happened that night but couldn't speak up. Due to the trauma of being falsely accused, Mehreen starts to hallucinate her father and Mahsal in jail.

Mehreen was soon bailed because Aswad arranges a lawyer for her. Late Mashal's parents weren't happy about Mehreen getting released as they still thought that Mehreen had poisoned Mashal. Aswad also thinks that Mehreen killed Mashal and behaves even more rudely to her. Aswad marries Mehreen to get revenge on Mashal's murder. Aswad emotionally starts abusing and torturing Mehreen blaming her for killing Mashal. This deteriorates Mehreen's mental state as she starts hallucinating Mashal telling Mehreen that she should kill herself and saying that that was what Aswad wanted too. After a series of similar events and Aswad forces Mehreen to sign an affidavit, making Mehreen falsely confess that she has killed Mashal became the last straw and Mehreen gets a nervous breakdown. She gets admitted to a hospital.

The Psychiatrist tells Aswad that it was because of Aswad's emotional abuse which brought Mehreen to this state. Aswad starts to feel guilty and Shaguftha calls Aswad's house to inform them to take Mehreen belongings as they don't want to keep her belongings anymore. Aswad goes to collect them and is shocked to see Mehreen's awards and paintings. He reminisces how Mashal used to show off the awards but now realises that they were all Mehreen's. Shabbo, who cannot keep the secret anymore, spills everything and unveils Mehreen's innocent past. Informing him that it was Mashal who was not bright in her studies, it was Mahsal who smoked. Aswad regrets his rude behavior towards Mehreen. He further questions about the real events which happened the night Mashal died. Shabbo reveals that it was Mashal who tried killing Mehreen but due to Shabbo's carelessness Mashal consumed it, as Shabbo put sleeping pills in Mashal's cup instead of Mehreen's cup. Aswad becomes shocked hearing this.

He goes home and reads Mehreen's diary realising he has been falsely accusing her and becomes remorseful of his acts. He goes to hospital but finds Mehreen in denial and asking for divorce from Aswad. But Aswad pleads Mehreen to listen to him once and he confesses everything. Mehreen also gives further details of the happenings of that night and also reveals that that that night Mashal and Mehreen decided to reconcile their differences confessing to each other that each of them had their complexes and hated each other because the elder's politics broke them apart. Mashal's mother forcing her to be like Mehreen. Both of them realised that it was enough that they fought and Shabbo brings both of them tea. Mashal realising that she had wanted to kill Mehreen as she thought the pills were in Mehreen's cup, she breaks Mehreen's cup from her hands. Unbeknownst that the sleeping pills were actually in her cup, Mashal consumes it. They both apologise to each other and forgive each other that night, hoping to reconcile the next morning. Not knowing that the night would be the last night that Mahsal would be alive.

Aswad becomes shocked learning this and he asks Mehreen for forgiveness, promising to love her like he did in his childhood. Mehreen forgives Aswad as she did with Mashal and they finally reconcile. Mehreen continues her incomplete degree with full support from Aswad and they start a new life together.

Cast

Main
Mahira Khan as Mehreen Mansoor/Mehreen Aswad Ayub
Tehreem Ali Hameed as Mehreen Mansoor (young)
Usman Mukhtar as Aswad Ayub
Zohair Siddiqui as Aswad Ayub (young)
Kubra Khan as Mashal Tahir (Dead)
Minahil Naveed as Mashal Tahir (young)

Recurring
Zainab Qayyum as Shagufta
Ali Tahir as Tahir
Huma Nawab as Saleha 
Haroon Shahid as Safwan
Omair Rana as Mansoor (dead)
Shamim Hilaly as Nani
Laila Wasti as Rabia
Annie Zaidi as Safwan's mother
Kaif Ghaznavi as Shabbo
Ameena Farooq as Shabbo (young) 
Nadia Hussain as Psychiatrist
Zara Ahmad as Sheeba
Haya Khan as Anum
Sidra Khan as Tooba
Khalid Malik as Police Inspector

Production
The project was first announced by Zainab Qayyum in late-March 2021 who confirmed on Instagram being part of the serial along with Kubra Khan, directed by Farooq Rind. Omair Rana in an interview revealed that he is starring in a serial and Mahira Khan will return to television after five years with the same serial.

Soundtrack

Reception

Critical reception 
While reviewing the starting episode, Haneena Moosa of the Daily Times wrote, "The drama begins with a very powerful dialogue, delivered by one of the drama’s protagonists Aswad". She further praised premise and subject of the serial. Critics praised the premise and storyline of the series.

While writing for The News, Maheen Zia termed some of the events regarding the character Aswad as unrealistic. Another reviewer of the newspaper called out it for the glorification of toxic relationships. Due to dragging storyline and slow pace, the series also gathered criticism from viewers and critics.

Television rating

Awards and nominations

Lux Style Awards

Hum Awards

References

External links
  
 

Urdu-language television shows
Pakistani drama television series
2021 Pakistani television series debuts
Hum TV original programming
Pakistani television dramas based on novels
Television series created by Momina Duraid
Pakistani romantic drama television series
Television series by MD Productions